Biryukov is a rural locality (a khutor) in Verkhnegnutovskoye Rural Settlement, Chernyshkovsky District, Volgograd Oblast, Russia. The population was 35 as of 2010.

Geography 
Biryukov is located 26 km south of Chernyshkovsky (the district's administrative centre) by road. Verkhnegnutov is the nearest rural locality.

References 

Rural localities in Chernyshkovsky District